"If I Didn't Have You" is a song recorded by American country music duo Thompson Square.  It was released in October 2012 as the first single from their album Just Feels Good. The song was written by the duo's Keifer and Shawna Thompson with Jason Sellers and Paul Jenkins.

Critical reception
Billy Dukes of Taste of Country gave the song four stars out of five, writing that "what this duo continues to do better than any man/woman pairing in Nashville is find that sweet spot between genuine and too real." Matt Bjorke of Roughstock also gave the song four stars out of five, saying that "the melody and production are modern in approach but once you hear Shawna Thompson['s] lead vocal, it's not hard to know that this is both a country song and something that's not of the 'also-ran' category."

Music video
The music video was directed by Brian Lazzaro and premiered in February 2013.

The videos depicts Keifer and Shawna going for a night out when their car gets struck by a semi, Shawna sustains major injuries and is asleep at the hospital recovering from her injuries while Keifer stays by her side, it also cuts into scenes of the couple singing together and Shawna's spirit singing with Keifer while she is still asleep recovering from her injuries. At the end of the video, Shawna wakes up and the duo embrace in a kiss.

Chart performance
"If I Didn't Have You" debuted at number 26 on the U.S. Billboard Hot Country Songs chart for the week of November 17, 2012. It also debuted at number 98 on the U.S. Billboard Hot 100 chart for the week of November 17, 2012. It also debuted at number 89 on the Canadian Hot 100 chart for the week of April 13, 2013. In May 2013, it became the duo's second number one.

Year-end charts

Certifications

References

2012 singles
2012 songs
Thompson Square songs
BBR Music Group singles
Song recordings produced by New Voice Entertainment
Songs written by Paul Jenkins (songwriter)
Songs written by Jason Sellers